Non-Broadcastable (is a stand-up comedy television program directed by Jamshid BayatTork, written by Shahram Shakiba and produced by Seyyed Jalal Chavoshian made for IRIB channel 5.

Plot
This television satire and social criticism produced in 100 less than 10 minutes episodes in 2009 starring Mohammad Solouki. This satirical television program tries to look at the cultural issues confronting society and modernity, occurred the metropolitan area of Tehran.

Mohammad Solouki tries to criticize these social phenomena in every episode with humorous stories.
Non-Broadcastable's production lasted two years. At first it was aired in the box of Tehran20 television program on IRIB 5. Then as an independent program aired on IRIB5 and IRIB Amoozesh.

Writers

Shahram Shakiba as the lead author wrote 47 scripts. Jamshid BayatTork wrote 24 scripts, Jalal Samiee 24 scripts, Reza Saki 2 scripts, Narges Ghaderi and Omid Mehdinejad and Mehdi Ostad Ahmad each one episode each as other script writers.

Episode titles

Credits
Producer: Seyyed Jalal Chavoshian
Executive Producer: Masoumeh Fard Shahin 
Script Writers:
Shahram Shakiba
Jamshid BayatTork
Jalal Samiee 
Reza Saki 
Narges Ghaderi 
Omid Mehdinejad 
Mehdi Ostad Ahmad

References

2010s Iranian television series
2015 Iranian television series debuts
2015 Iranian television series endings
Iranian television series
Islamic Republic of Iran Broadcasting original programming
Persian-language television shows